Let it Bleed is a 1995 crime novel by Ian Rankin. It is the seventh of the Inspector Rebus novels. The US edition has a final chapter which the UK edition does not have, as the author's 'Introduction' explains.

Plot summary

Detective Inspector John Rebus and Frank Lauderdale start the book with a car chase across Edinburgh to apprehend kidnappers, culminating with the two youths they are chasing throwing themselves off the Forth Road Bridge and in Rebus being injured in a car crash. Rebus's upset over this allows Rankin to show the character in a new light, revealing his isolation and potentially suicidal despair.

After the unconnected suicide of a terminally ill con, Rebus pursues an investigation that implicates respected people at the highest levels of government, and due to the politically sensitive nature of what he is doing, faces losing his job, or worse. He is supported by his daughter Sammy, allowing their distant relationship to be built upon.

Publishing notes

The title refers to the Rolling Stones album Let it Bleed.

In once scene in the novel, Rankin describes Rebus putting his foot onto the bar rail in the Oxford Bar when a band is playing. This, Rankin states, caused many people to contact him to say that there wasn't a bar rail in the Oxford at that time. Rankin mused that this mistake (he claims he mis-remembered) has led to more complaints than anything else including historical inaccuracies or police procedure.

The American version of the book includes a final chapter not seen in the original UK publication. The American publishers were unhappy with the open-ending in the book and so commissioned Rankin to complete the story for the American market.

TV serial
An episode of the television series "Rebus" was filmed based on the book with some differences to the original novel. Ken Stott starred as Rebus.

References

1996 British novels
Inspector Rebus novels
Novels set in Edinburgh
Orion Books books